Matt Ford is a lighting designer based in Los Angeles, California. His notable projects have included NBC's Hollywood Game Night, America's Got Talent, ABC's Jimmy Kimmel Live!, CW's Penn and Teller Fool Us.

He has designed lighting for a wide range of television productions.  He is also the co-creator of the Los Angeles haunted attraction The House at Haunted Hill.

Primetime Emmy Awards and Nominations

References

External links 
 

Year of birth missing (living people)
Living people
People from Los Angeles
American lighting designers